"Alone" is a song by Belgian dance trio Lasgo. It was released in 2001 as the second single from their debut album, Some Things (2002). While not as successful as "Something", the song was a top-10 hit in Flanders and the United Kingdom.

Charts

Weekly charts

Year-end charts

Release history

References

2001 singles
2001 songs
Lasgo songs
Songs written by Peter Luts
Positiva Records singles